Maurizio Lucidi (1932–2005) was an Italian director, screenwriter and editor, sometimes credited as Mark Lender.

Born in Florence, Lucidi started his career as film editor in the early 1960s.  In 1964 he was assistant director for Pier Paolo Pasolini on The Gospel According to St. Matthew. He made his directorial debut in 1966 with Hercules the Avenger; later he directed a number of genre films, especially Spaghetti Westerns.

Selected filmography 
 The Changing of the Guard (1962)
My Name Is Pecos (1966)
Pecos Cleans Up (1967)
Halleluja for Django (1967) 
La battaglia del Sinai (1969)
Probabilità zero (1968)
It Can Be Done Amigo (1971)
The Designated Victim (1971)
Stateline Motel  (1973)
Due cuori, una cappella (1975)
Street People (1975)
Il marito in collegio (1977)
Tutto suo padre (1978)
Perché non facciamo l’amore? (1981)

References

External links 
 

1932 births
2005 deaths
Film people from Florence
Italian film directors
20th-century Italian screenwriters
Italian male screenwriters
Spaghetti Western directors
Italian film editors
20th-century Italian male writers